Bio-1 is a consortium of partners founded in 2007 designed to identify and promote bioscience in the Central New Jersey area. It is the result of a $5 million grant made available by the Workforce Innovation in Regional Economic Development (WIRED) program.

Mission statement

Bio-1's goal is to make Central New Jersey (CNJ) the next “hot spot” for the global bioscience industry, by creating high-quality, high-paying jobs and a skilled workforce. The five-county BIO-1 partnership is named for the Route 1 corridor from Rutgers to Princeton, around which most of CNJ's biotech firms are clustered. The CNJ region, comprising Hunterdon, Mercer, Middlesex, Monmouth, and Somerset counties, has received $5 million, available under the Workforce Innovation in Regional Economic Development (WIRED) program from the United States Department of Labor (USDOL). The WIRED grant will be used to transform the rich array of existing bioscience education and training and economic development initiatives into a world class bioscience talent development system.

The partnership has its roots in an initiative created by Governor Jon Corzine as part of his statewide economic strategy. This is the third WIRED investment in New Jersey, making it “the most WIRED state” in the U.S.

Goals

In collaboration with representatives of all key players in the biosciences in CNJ, the Bio-1 initiative will focus on six key strategies:

 Excite young people about the bio-sciences, especially focusing on underrepresented groups.
 Create a consortium of biotechnology educators from the high school through university levels that will facilitate smooth career pathways through articulation agreements, mentoring and professional development.
 Transform graduate education with the development of professional science master's degrees that integrate business and science, and interdisciplinary Ph.D. programs in biotech areas.
 Increase bioscience workforce development with education and training opportunities. A “flak jackets to lab coats” initiative, for example, will focus on training and job placement in the bioscience industry for returning veterans.
 Enhance linkages between education and industry through internships, cooperative education and mentoring.
 Facilitate globally competitive “biobusinesses” by encouraging collaboration between business and education, supporting bioscience start-ups and leveraging existing global networks.

Partners

Industry groups
 BioNJ, Inc. (formerly Biotechnology Council of NJ, representing over 300 Member companies)
 HealthCare Institute of New Jersey (representing 34 pharmaceutical and medical device companies)

Individual companies
 Johnson & Johnson
 Celgene
 PTC Therapeutics
 Elusys Therapeutics
 Vicus
 Genmab
 Merck
 Sanofi-Aventis
 Bristol-Myers Squibb

Workforce Investment Boards
 Middlesex County WIB
 Monmouth County WIB
 Greater Raritan Valley WIB (Somerset and Hunterdon counties)
 Mercer County WIB

Colleges and universities
 Rutgers University
 Princeton University
 Monmouth University
 Rider University
 The College of New Jersey
 University of Medicine and Dentistry of New Jersey (UMDNJ)
 Robert Wood Johnson Medical School (RWJMS)
 Consortium of County Colleges including:
 Raritan Valley Community College
 Brookdale Community College
 Middlesex County College
 Mercer County Community College

Research institutes
 Cancer Institute of NJ
 Stem Cell Institute of New Jersey
 Center for Advanced Biotechnology and Medicine (CABM)
 Biotechnology Center for Agriculture and the Environment
 Waksman Institute of Microbiology

High schools
 Biotechnology High School (Monmouth County)
 Waksman Scholars – 20+ high schools
 Rider University partner high schools

Government and non-profit organizations
 New Jersey Economic Development Authority
 New Brunswick Innovation Zone
 Edison Venture Fund
 New Jersey Department of Labor and Workforce Development
 New Jersey Department of Education
 State Employment and Training Commission
 New Jersey Commission on Higher Education
 New Jersey Commission on Science and Technology
 Governor's Life Science Workforce Advisory Council
 The Biotechnology Institute

References

External links
 Bio-1 Homepage
 WIRED Homepage
 US Department of Labor
 US Department of Labor Employment & Training Administration
 BioNJ Homepage

Research organizations in the United States